The 1935 AAA Championship Car season consisted of six races, beginning in Speedway, Indiana on May 30 and concluding in Langhorne, Pennsylvania on October 13.  There was also one non-championship event.  The AAA National Champion and Indianapolis 500 winner was Kelly Petillo.

Schedule and results
All races running on Dirt/Brick Oval.

Leading National Championship standings

References

See also
 1935 Indianapolis 500

AAA Championship Car season
AAA Championship Car
1935 in American motorsport